

Hans Gollnick (22 May 1892 – 15 February 1970) was a general in the Wehrmacht of Nazi Germany during World War II. He was a recipient of the Knight's Cross of the Iron Cross with Oak Leaves.

At the beginning of World War II, Gollnick was commander of an infantry regiment in the Charge at Krojanty. During the war, he was awarded the Knight's Cross of the Iron Cross in 1942, and promoted to general in 1943.

Awards
 Iron Cross (1914) 2nd Class (11 October 1914) & 1st Class (24 November 1916)
 Clasp to the Iron Cross (1939) 2nd Class (15 September 1939) & 1st Class (5 October 1939)
 Knight's Cross of the Iron Cross with Oak Leaves
 Knight's Cross on 21 November 1942 as Generalmajor and commander of the 36. Infanterie-Division (mot.)
 282nd Oak Leaves on 24 August 1943 as Generalleutnant and commander of the 36. Panzergrenadier-Division

References

Citations

Bibliography

 
 

1892 births
1970 deaths
People from Złotów County
Generals of Infantry (Wehrmacht)
German Army personnel of World War I
Prussian Army personnel
People from West Prussia
Recipients of the Knight's Cross of the Iron Cross with Oak Leaves
Recipients of the clasp to the Iron Cross, 1st class
Reichswehr personnel
German Army generals of World War II